Uki Workboat Oy (Finnish: Uudenkaupungin Työvene Oy) is a Finnish shipyard located in Uusikaupunki on the Western coast of Finland. The company specializes in small and medium-sized vessels for professional use, ranging from aluminium-hulled workboats to steel-hulled multipurpose ships and road ferries. The facilities consist of one  slipway and production halls where boats up to a length of  can be manufactured indoors.

Most of the shipyard's newbuildings are one-off products, but smaller boats have also been built in series of up to 18 vessels. , Uki Workboat has delivered over 220 vessels with the largest being the Finnish pollution control vessel Louhi, which was delivered in 2011. The company also built the presidential yacht of the President of Finland, Kultaranta VIII.

Whereas the Finnish name of the company uses the full name of the city where the shipyard is located, the English-language name contains the commonly used shorter nickname Uki.

Ships

Naval
 Finnish Navy: Finnish pollution control vessel Louhi
 Finnish Navy: Fabian Wrede-class training ship
 UK Border Force: HMC Protector
 Offshore Oil Collecting Patrol Vessel Kindral Kurvits
 SYKE/ Finnish Navy: OPV Hylje refit
 Finnish Navy: Pansio-class minelayer Mid-life Upgrade
 Rajavartiolaitos: Multitask Patrol Boat RV15E

Civilian
 Waxholmsbolaget: MV Nämdö
 Waxholmsbolaget: MV Gällnö
 Self Propelled Road Ferry Saturnus
 Cable Ferry Embla
 SAR vessel Jenny Wihuri
 Fast SAR Vessel Svante G
 Double ended passenger ferry Braheborg
 Västtrafik: Älveli and Älfrida, hybrid ready passenger ferry
 Arctia: Harbour Icebreaker Ahto

References

External links 
 Official website

Shipbuilding companies of Finland